Notre univers impitoyable (English title: What If...?) is a 2008 French film written and directed by Léa Fazer. The film stars Alice Taglioni, Jocelyn Quivrin, Thierry Lhermitte, Pascale Arbillot, Julie Ferrier and Scali Delpeyrat. The soundtrack was composed by Sébastien Schuller.

Cast 
 Alice Taglioni as Margot Dittermann
 Jocelyn Quivrin as Victor Bandini
 Thierry Lhermitte as Nicolas Bervesier
 Pascale Arbillot as Juliette
 Scali Delpeyrat as Bertrand Lavoisier
 Julie Ferrier as Éléonore
 Eliot Pasqualon as Antonin
 Denise Aron-Schropfer as Margot's mother
 Antonio Cauchois as Margot's father
 Léa Fazer as the jeweler 
 Joe Sheridan as Goudal

References

External links 

2008 films
Films directed by Léa Fazer
Films about lawyers
French romantic comedy films
2008 romantic comedy films
2000s French films